The 1978–79 Football League Cup was the 19th season of the Football League Cup, a knockout competition for England's top 92 football clubs. The competition started on 12 August 1978 and ended with the final on 17 March 1979.

The final was contested by First Division teams Nottingham Forest and Southampton at Wembley Stadium in London.

First round

First leg

Second leg

Replays

Second round

Replays

2nd Replay

Third round

Replays

2nd Replay

Fourth round

Replay

Fifth Round

Replay

Semi-finals

First leg

Second leg

Final

Match details

References

General

Specific

EFL Cup seasons
1978–79 domestic association football cups
Lea
Cup